This is a recap of the 1980 season for the Professional Bowlers Association (PBA) Tour.  It was the tour's 22nd season, and consisted of 34 events. Wayne Webb broke the six-season Earl Anthony-Mark Roth stranglehold on PBA Player of the Year awards, as he achieved the honor on the strength of three titles, including the Firestone Tournament of Champions major. Webb was also the Tour's leading money winner on the season.

Steve Martin won his second career PBA title and first major at the BPAA U.S. Open. The following week, Johnny Petraglia captured the title at the PBA National Championship to give him his third career major and all three jewels of the PBA's "triple crown." Only Billy Hardwick had achieved this same feat to date.

Mark Roth made PBA Tour history in the finals of the season-opening event in Alameda, California, when he became the first player to convert the 7-10 split on national television.

Tournament schedule

References

External links
 1980 Season Schedule

Professional Bowlers Association seasons
1980 in bowling